Mathias Eikenes (born 13 February 1985) is a retired Norwegian football striker.

Growing up in Sandane TIL, he represented Norway as a youth international. He joined Sogndal IL ahead of the 2004 season, with a loan back to Sandane until 1 July. In the summer of 2006 he went on to Stryn TIL.

In 2009 he joined Ranheim IL, and followed by a period in Sandane as well as a hiatus he rejoined Stryn in 2013. Finishing with his education as a medical doctor, he In 2014 he was employed by Ålesund Hospital and played from 2014 to 2017 for Spjelkavik IL.

References

1985 births
Living people
Norwegian footballers
People from Gloppen
Sogndal Fotball players
Stryn TIL players
Ranheim Fotball players
Spjelkavik IL players
Eliteserien players
Norwegian First Division players
Association football forwards
Norway youth international footballers
Norway under-21 international footballers
Sportspeople from Vestland